The Non-Equity Joseph Jefferson Award for an Outstanding Actor in a Cameo Role in a Musical is a decennial award presented to a non-equity theatrical production of a musical within the Chicago theatre community containing an actor in a cameo role.

Nominations

2000s
 No recipients
 Hunchback - Redmoon Theater

2010s
 No recipients
 Ah, Wilderness! - Eclipse Theater Company

Theatre acting awards